Dakota County v. Glidden, 113 U.S. 222 (1885), was a motion to dismiss a suit issued in aid of a railroad. Judgment for the plaintiff. The defendant brought a writ of error to reverse it. Subsequently, to the judgment, Dakota County, Nebraska settled with the plaintiff and other bondholders, by giving them new bonds bearing a less rate of interest, and the old bonds, which were the cause of action in this suit, were surrendered and destroyed. These facts were brought before this Court by affidavits and transcripts from the county records, accompanied by a motion to dismiss the writ of error.

While payment of the sum recovered in submission to the judgment is no bar to the right of reversal of the judgment when brought here by writ of error, a compromise and settlement of the demand in suit, whereby a new agreement is substituted in place of the old one, extinguishes the cause of action, and leaves nothing for the exercise of the jurisdiction of this Court.

Evidence of facts outside of the record, affecting the proceeding of the court in a case on error or appeal, will be received and considered, when deemed necessary by the court, for the purpose of determining its action.

The court saw no reason to impeach the transaction by which the new bonds were substituted for the old, and the writ of error was accordingly dismissed.

See also
List of United States Supreme Court cases, volume 113

References

External links
 

United States Supreme Court cases
1885 in United States case law
Dakota County, Nebraska
United States Supreme Court cases of the Waite Court